Conrad Rucker (born November 15, 1954) is a former American football tight end. He played for the Houston Oilers from 1978 to 1979 and for the Tampa Bay Buccaneers and Los Angeles Rams in 1980.

References

1954 births
Living people
American football tight ends
Southern Jaguars football players
Houston Oilers players
Tampa Bay Buccaneers players
Los Angeles Rams players